Mayoiga  in Japanese folklore refers to a "lavish" or "well-kept" but abandoned house found in remote parts of the mountains or similar wilderness.

See also
 Japanese haunted towns
 Misaki no Mayoiga
 The Lost Village (TV series)

References

Japanese folklore